Shady Rest, Tennessee may refer to:

Shady Rest, Hamilton County, Tennessee
Shady Rest, Warren County, Tennessee